The DFB-Pokal Frauen is the main national women's football cup competition in Germany, thus the female counterpart to the DFB-Pokal. It was created in 1980, and since 1991 includes Eastern teams as well. The most recent champions are VfL Wolfsburg (five consecutive titles). FFC Frankfurt has won the most titles with nine. The final has, with the exception of the 1983 final, always been held on the same day prior to the men's final. Since 1985 the final has thus been held in Berlin. Only in 1983, it was held in the city of Frankfurt. This routine changed in 2010 when the finale was the DFB gave the final to the city of Cologne. It ever stayed in the city and was held at the RheinEnergieStadion. The final usually takes place on a weekend or holiday in early May, independently from the men's finale, in order to gain more attention.

Format

Participation
All clubs from the Bundesliga and the 2nd Bundesliga are allowed to compete in the cup as are the clubs which gained promotion to the 2nd Bundesliga. Also the winners of the regional cup competitions compete in the cup. As an exception to these rules, clubs' second teams are not allowed to participate in the DFB-Pokal. When a second team wins its regional cup, that team's regional association may send another team to the DFB-Pokal only if the cup winning second team has not also achieved promotion to the 2nd Bundesliga.

Seeding
Of the qualified teams, not all have to compete in the first round. Exactly 32 teams have to compete in the second round of the tournament, so in the first round the number of matches is determined by the number of excess teams, resulting in one match for each team after the 32nd. The teams that do not have to compete in the first round are the best finishers from the previous Bundesliga season, the number again determined by the number of entrants to the tournament.

The pairings for round one, two, and three are not entirely random as there is a commission allocating the clubs to two or four groups as they see fit. These groups correspond with the regional provenance of the clubs. In the third round the commission can decide not to allocate the contestants to any groups. Within those groups the clubs are again separated, this time depending on the league they play in. For the draw, clubs from the Bundesligas are put in one pot and the rest in a second pot. Non-Bundesliga clubs automatically have home advantage against clubs from the Bundesligas.

Match rules
All games are held over two 45-minute halves with the winner advancing to the next round. In case of a draw, the game gets an extended by two 15-minute halves. If the score is still level after 120 minutes the winner is decided by penalty shootout. In the final no extra time is added in case of a draw after 90 minutes, instead the penalty shootout follows immediately.

Winners
Before the reunification of Germany the cup competition included teams from West Germany only.

Winners by team

(*) Note: Runner-up of  VfL Wolfsburg as VfR Eintracht Wolfsburg

References

External links

List of Cup Finals at rsssf.com

 
ger
Women's football competitions in Germany
Recurring sporting events established in 1980
3